Trebudannon is a hamlet situated one mile south-southwest of St. Columb Major in mid Cornwall, England, United Kingdom.

Point to point horse racing meets are staged twice a year in Trebudannon and Murtaya sports cars are constructed on a farm nearby.

References

Hamlets in Cornwall
Horse racing venues in England
St Columb Major